Chloe N Skelton (born 20 June 2001) is an English cricketer who currently plays for Gloucestershire and Western Storm. She plays as a right-handed batter and occasional right-arm off break bowler.

Domestic career
Skelton made her county debut in 2018, for Gloucestershire against Oxfordshire. In her second match, Skelton made 134* from 143 balls in a 228-run victory for her side against Buckinghamshire. In 2019, Skelton was Gloucestershire's leading run-scorer in the County Championship, with 103 runs at an average of 25.75. In 2021, Skelton was the fifth-highest run-scorer across the whole competition in the Twenty20 Cup, with 201 runs at an average of 67.00, including 70* made against Cornwall. In the 2022 Women's Twenty20 Cup, she was Gloucestershire's leading wicket-taker, with 7 wickets including her Twenty20 best bowling figures of 4/24 taken against Warwickshire, as well as scoring 98 runs.

In February 2021, Skelton was named in the Western Storm Academy for the upcoming season. She scored 109 for the Academy in a match against Lightning Academy in July 2021. In September 2021, Skelton was added to the full Western Storm squad, and made her debut for the side on 10 September, against Northern Diamonds in the Rachael Heyhoe Flint Trophy, scoring 30 from 51 balls. She went on to play two more matches for the side that season, batting once more, scoring 13* against Lightning. She played four matches for Western Storm in 2022, all in the Rachael Heyhoe Flint Trophy, and was the side's second-highest wicket-taker in the tournament, with 10 wickets at an average of 17.20. Against South East Stars, Skelton took her maiden five-wicket haul, returning figures of 5/54 from her 10 overs. At the end of the 2022 season, it was announced that Skelton had signed her first professional contract with Western Storm.

References

External links

2001 births
Living people
Place of birth missing (living people)
Gloucestershire women cricketers
Western Storm cricketers